Aleksei Pavlovich Prudnikov (born 20 March 1960) is a former USSR and Russian football player who played as a goalkeeper.

Club career
His clubs were Spartak Moscow, Dynamo Moscow, Torpedo Moscow, Baltika Kaliningrad, Kolos Krasnodar, and Velež Mostar, Sarajevo in Yugoslavia, Chonbuk Hyundai Dinos in South Korea, Jaro in Finland.

International
Prudnikov played for the Soviet U-21 and Olympic teams, as well as an unofficial Soviet representative team at the 1988 President's Cup Football Tournament.

References

External links
 

1960 births
Footballers from Moscow
Living people
Association football goalkeepers
Soviet footballers
Russian footballers
Soviet expatriate footballers
Russian expatriate footballers
FC Spartak Moscow players
FC Dynamo Moscow players
FC Torpedo Moscow players
FK Velež Mostar players
FK Sarajevo players
FF Jaro players
FC Baltika Kaliningrad players
Jeonbuk Hyundai Motors players
Soviet Top League players
Veikkausliiga players
Russian Premier League players
K League 1 players
Expatriate footballers in Yugoslavia
Yugoslav First League players
Expatriate footballers in Finland
Expatriate footballers in South Korea
Olympic footballers of the Soviet Union
Olympic gold medalists for the Soviet Union
Footballers at the 1988 Summer Olympics
Russian expatriate sportspeople in South Korea
Olympic medalists in football
Medalists at the 1988 Summer Olympics
Soviet expatriate sportspeople in Yugoslavia